First National Bank was a bank in Philadelphia. Chartered in 1863, it was the first national bank created under the Civil War banking reforms that began to define the modern U.S. banking system, and the first commercial bank to issue a federal banknote. It operated independently until 1955, when it was merged into the Bank of North America and Trust Company, today part of Wells Fargo.

History

Founding 
During the Civil War, the cash-strapped Lincoln administration, acting on the suggestion of Philadelphia financier Jay Cooke, sought to create a true national currency by fostering a class of strong banks entitled to print banknotes backed by the U.S. government. Congress took up the effort with the 1863 National Banking Act and National Currency Act, passing the latter on February 25, 1863.

Uncoincidentally, the first charter under the new Act went to a group of Philadelphia financiers that included Cooke. They received the charter on June 20, opened the doors of First National Bank on July 11, and that same day became the first commercial bank to issue a federal banknote.

The bank's first president was Owen Wilson Davis, who on June 16, 1863, provided money to buy horses for the First Troop Philadelphia City Cavalry so it could deploy to meet the Confederate Army at Gettysburg.

The bank's president from 1863 to 1873 was Clarence Howard Clark, Sr.

Mergers 
In 1955, First National Bank merged with the Bank of North America and Trust Company, a successor to the Bank of North America, to become The First Pennsylvania Banking and Trust Company.  This firm became Corestates which was acquired by First Union, which became Wachovia Bank, which was acquired by Wells Fargo in 2009.

Building
The bank commissioned a new building at 315 Chestnut Street, which became "an anchor of what was America's original Wall Street." Designed by Philadelphia architect John McArthur Jr., for a fee of $3,500, the building's cornerstone was laid on May 23, 1866, and it was completed by contractor John Rice for $121,300 
($ today). The vault, or "thief-proof", and locks were provided by Farrell and Herring for $16,310.

The Historic American Buildings Survey describes the building as a "Masonry and brick building; rectangular plan 60' × 82' []; two stories high; symmetrical, three-bay facade; architectural membering of the facade with pedestals, engaged columns and piers, belt course, entablatures, cornice and roof balustrade; round-headed openings." It was considered "outstanding as an example of the Palazzo facade adapted to a bank building".

In 1953, the interior was stripped, and the building later became vacant.

In 1995, the building was acquired by the Chemical Heritage Foundation, which renovated it as a museum of the history of chemistry. As of February 1, 2018, the Chemical Heritage Foundation was renamed the Science History Institute.

See also

List of bank mergers in the United States

References

Bank buildings in Philadelphia
Banks based in Philadelphia
Banks established in 1863
1863 establishments in Pennsylvania
Wells Fargo legacy banks
1860s architecture in the United States
Neoclassical architecture in Pennsylvania
Defunct banks of the United States